Allium atroviolaceum is a species of flowering plant in the Amaryllidaceae family. it is commonly called the broadleaf wild leek, and is native to Iran, Iraq, Afghanistan, Syria, Lebanon, Saudi Arabia, Turkmenistan, Turkey, Georgia, Armenia, Azerbaijan, southern European Russia and the Caucasus, but widely cultivated in other regions as a food source and for its ornamental value. The species is sparingly naturalized in parts of the United States (Illinois, Kentucky, Virginia, and North and South Carolina) and also in southeastern Europe (Italy, Greece, the Czech Republic, Slovakia, Hungary, Ukraine and the Balkans).

Allium atroviolaceum is a perennial herb producing a large round bulb. Scape is up to 100 cm long. Leaves are broadly linear. Umbel is spherical with many purple or red-violet flowers crowded together.

References

External links
Agroatlas, Interactive Agricultural Ecological Atlas of Russia and Neighboring Countries, Allium atroviolaceum
Acta Plantarum Galleria della Flora Italiana, Allium atroviolaceum 
Flora nel Salento e Anche Altrove, Allium atroviolaceum Boiss - Amaryllidaceae - Aglio viola scuro 
Trek Nature, Allium atroviolaceum, Artanish Peninsula (on Lake Sevan in Armenia)
Növényhatározó Sötét hagyma, Allium atroviolaceum (in Hungarian) 
Plantarium, Определитель растений on-line, Описание таксона, Allium atroviolaceum Boiss. (in Russian) 

atroviolaceum
Onions
Flora of temperate Asia
Flora of Europe
Plants described in 1846
Edible plants
Garden plants
Taxa named by Pierre Edmond Boissier